The 1929 Campeonato Paulista was the 28th season of São Paulo's top association football league. Two championships were disputed that season, each by a different league (APEA and LAF).

APEA Championship

In the edition organized by the APEA (Associação Paulista de Esportes Atléticos), Corinthians won the title for the 7th time. no teams were relegated and the top scorer was Feitiço with 13 goals.

System
The championship was disputed in a single round-robin system, with the team with the most points winning the title.

Championship

LAF Championship

The edition organized by the LAF (Liga dos Amadores de Futebol) in 1929, is the last edition of amateur level of football in São Paulo realized. After this championship, the most successful club and current champions Paulistano withdrew and never returned to football.

System
The championship was disputed in a double round-robin format, with the team with the less points losts criteria winning the title.

Championship

References

Campeonato Paulista seasons
Paulista